Márquez is a surname of Spanish origin.

Márquez may also refer to:

Places
Marquez, Texas, a small town in the US
Marquez crater, an impact crater in the US state of Texas
Márquez Province, a province in Colombia
Márquez River, a river in Bolivia

Other uses
USS Diploma (AM-221), renamed ARM Cadete Francisco Márquez (C59)
Marquez (grape), another name for the Portuguese wine grape Loureira

See also
Marqués (disambiguation)